Gatteo is a comune (municipality) in the Province of Forlì-Cesena in the Italian region Emilia-Romagna, located about  southeast of Bologna and about  southeast of Forlì.

Gatteo borders the following municipalities: Cesenatico, Gambettola, Longiano, Savignano sul Rubicone.

Demographic evolution

References

External links 
 www.comune.gatteo.fo.it/
 Gatteo on The Campanile Project

Cities and towns in Emilia-Romagna